Mikhail Shemetau (born 21 July 1994) is a Belarusian road and track cyclist, who represents Belarus at international competitions. He competed at the 2016 UCI Track Cycling World Championships in the individual pursuit event and at the 2016 UEC European Track Championships in the team pursuit event.

References

External links

1994 births
Living people
Belarusian male cyclists
Belarusian track cyclists
Place of birth missing (living people)
Cyclists at the 2019 European Games
European Games competitors for Belarus